The Disastrous Life of Saiki K. is a Japanese manga series written and illustrated by Shūichi Asō. The series began serialization in Shueisha's Weekly Shonen Jump magazine on May 14, 2012. The first collected tankōbon volume was published on September 4, 2012, with 25 volumes released as of April 2018. The series ended serialization on February 26, 2018. Shueisha later revealed that a 4-panel sequel would begin serialization on March 5, 2018. Asō also published a one-shot manga in the first summer 2018 issue of Shueisha's Jump Giga on May 25, and another chapter on July 26, 2018.



Volume list

References

Disastrous Life of Saiki K., The